Guillena is a city located in the province of Seville, Spain. According to the 2005 census (INE), the city has a population of 9,035 inhabitants.

Nature 

Has a zoo with white lions, among other animalsPresentado 'The White King', el 'Rey León' blanco nacido en Sevilla (Spanish)

References

External links
Guillena - Sistema de Información Multiterritorial de Andalucía

Municipalities of the Province of Seville